Tom Gabbay (born April 1, 1953) is a United States novelist and screenwriter, best known for the Jack Teller series of historical spy thrillers.

Life 
Gabbay was born in Bloomington, Indiana. In his early career, he contributed political cartoons to the Philadelphia Daily News, produced films for the children's television series, Sesame Street, and was a program executive for NBC Television. He has also written a number of screenplays and was creator and Executive Producer of the 1990s television series The Wanderer.

Books 
 Access Point: A Psychological Thriller (2020) 
  The Tehran Conviction (2009) ,  
  The Lisbon Crossing (2008) ,   
  The Berlin Conspiracy (2006) ,

Screen 
 The Princess Stallion (1997) - screenwriter
 The Wanderer (1994) - creator and executive producer

References

External links 

1953 births
Living people
Writers from Indiana